Kintu is a Bugandan mythological figure. It may also refer to:

Michael Kintu, former chief minister of Buganda
Kato Kintu, the first kabaka (king) of the Buganda kingdom
Kintu Musoke, former Prime Minister of Uganda
Kintu (novel), a novel by Ugandan author Jennifer Nansubuga Makumbi